The First Day on the Somme is a First World War military history book by Martin Middlebrook, first published in 1971 and still in print, which is regarded as a seminal work in the field of World War I scholarship reflecting England's perspective in the conflict. Its text covers in detail the events leading up to and during 1 July 1916, the first day of the Battle of the Somme, concentrating almost exclusively on the British Army's experiences and focussing only in relief on French Army's contribution, especially south of the Somme River.

Early chapters deal with the formation of Kitchener's Army (New Army), which comprised a substantial part of the British Army's order of battle for the day, and the origins and planning of the Somme offensive. The coverage of the fighting is divided by time of day, starting with the hours leading up to "zero", followed by "zero hour", the morning, afternoon and night, with review chapters between each to sum up the fighting. The book concludes with the aftermath of the first day and a calculation of the cost of the fighting. The British casualty figures compiled by Middlebrook are often quoted as the definitive tally for 1 July.

Throughout the book Middlebrook uses quotations from soldiers involved in the fighting on the day, following ten men's stories. These men presenting a cross-section of the British Army of 1916 — Regular Army, New Army and Territorial Force — with ranks from privates up to battalion commander (lieutenant colonel).

See also 

First day on the Somme

External links
 A letter from Middlebrook describing the writing of The First Day on the Somme

1971 non-fiction books
History books about World War I
Works about the Battle of the Somme